Hot Country Songs is a record chart that ranks the top-performing country music songs in the United States, published by Billboard magazine.  In 1989, 50 songs topped the chart, then published under the title Hot Country Singles, in 52 issues of the magazine.  Only "I'm No Stranger to the Rain" by Keith Whitley and "The Church on Cumberland Road" by Shenandoah, consecutive chart-toppers in April, spent more than a single week at number one.

This was the final complete year in which Billboard used its longstanding methodology of compiling the chart based on playlists submitted by country music radio stations and sales reports submitted by stores.  In January of the following year, the magazine would begin basing the chart on weekly airplay data from radio stations compiled by Nielsen Broadcast Data Systems, which would lead to an increase in the length of time songs spent in the top spot.  In November 1989, Billboard began compiling unpublished prototype charts using the new methodology ahead of the official launch, which produced very different results to the published charts using the existing process.  Ronnie Milsap's "A Woman in Love" spent five weeks atop the prototype charts as opposed to the single week which it achieved on the published listing.  It was the 35th and final number one of Milsap's career.

Bands Alabama and Shenandoah, vocalists George Strait, Randy Travis and Rodney Crowell, and mother-daughter duo the Judds each reached number one with three different songs in 1989.  As one of Shenandoah's songs spent a second week at number one, this meant that the band was the only act to spend four weeks in the top spot during the year.  In June, Clint Black achieved his first number one with his debut single "A Better Man", which made him the first artist since Freddy Fender in 1975 to top the chart with his first charting release.  Other artists to reach number one for the first time in 1989 were Holly Dunn, Patty Loveless, and Garth Brooks, who achieved the first chart-topper of his career with "If Tomorrow Never Comes".  Brooks would go on to become one of the most successful artists in country music history, achieving unprecedented levels of album sales and selling out large stadiums in a manner previously associated only with rock stars.  Rosanne Cash spent a week at number one in June with "I Don't Want to Spoil the Party", the only cover version of a song originally recorded by the Beatles to top the country singles chart. Keith Whitley's second number one of the year, "I Wonder Do You Think of Me", was the first of two posthumous number ones for the singer, who died on May 9, 1989.

Chart history

See also
1989 in music
List of artists who reached number one on the U.S. country chart

References

1989
1989 record charts
1989 in American music